Jutta Steinruck (born 1 September 1962) is a German politician of the Social Democratic Party, part of the Party of European Socialists. From 2009 until 2017, she served as Member of the European Parliament (MEP) representing Germany. Since 2018 she serves as Lord Mayor of Ludwigshafen.

Political career

Member of the European Parliament, 2009–2017
During her time as Member of the European Parliament, Steinruck served on the following committees:
Member, Committee on Employment and Social Affairs (2009–2017)
Member, Delegation for relations with the Arab Peninsula (2009–2014)
Member, Delegation to the EU-Albania Stabilisation and Association Parliamentary Committee (2014–2017)

In addition to her committee assignments, Steinruck served as a member of the European Parliament Intergroup on Western Sahara and as chairwoman of the European Parliament Intergroup on Trade Unions.

Mayor of Ludwigshafen, 2018–present
Steinruck has been serving as Mayor of Ludwigshafen since 2018.

Other activities
 Ludwigshafen Hospital, Ex-Officio Chairwoman of the Supervisory Board (since 2018)
 Technische Werke Ludwigshafen AG (TWL), Ex-Officio Chairwoman of the Supervisory Board (since 2018) 
 German United Services Trade Union (ver.di), Member

Awards

 Royal Jubilee Medal

References

1962 births
Living people
Social Democratic Party of Germany MEPs
MEPs for Germany 2009–2014
MEPs for Germany 2014–2019
21st-century women MEPs for Germany
People from Ludwigshafen